Pedro González Olivares (12 December 1937 – 10 January 2021), nicknamed "Speedy Gonzalez", was a Dominican professional baseball second baseman, who played in Major League Baseball (MLB) for the New York Yankees (1963–65) and Cleveland Indians (1965-67). He was one of the first 15 Dominicans to play big league baseball.

In 407 career MLB games, González had 264 hits with a batting average of .244, 8 home runs, and 70 runs batted in (RBI). He finished his major league career with an overall .980 fielding percentage.

The Indians acquired González on 10 May 1965 in exchange for first baseman Ray Barker.

González died on 10 January 2021.

References

External links

1937 births
2021 deaths
Atlanta Braves scouts
Cleveland Indians players
Dominican Republic expatriate baseball players in the United States
Dominican Republic people of Cocolo descent
Dominican Republic people of Spanish descent
Major League Baseball players from the Dominican Republic
New York Yankees players
Sportspeople from San Pedro de Macorís